Bernthal is a surname. Notable people with the surname include:

 Bernie Bernthal (born 1960), American retired soccer player 
 Jon Bernthal (born 1976), American actor
 Murray Bernthal (1911–2010), American musician and producer 
 Frederick Bernthal (born 1943), United States Assistant Secretary of State for Oceans and International Environmental and Scientific Affairs from 1988 to 1990

Ashkenazi surnames
Yiddish-language surnames